Darryl Sampson (born September 21, 1963 in Port of Spain, Trinidad) is a former defensive back who played eleven seasons in the Canadian Football League for two different teams. Sampson participated in 4 Grey Cups with victories in 1988 and 1990. In 1993, he was selected to the East and CFL All-Star teams.

In 2004, Sampson was inducted into the Winnipeg Blue Bombers Hall of Fame.

References

External links
Bio

1963 births
Living people
Canadian football defensive backs
Hamilton Tiger-Cats players
York Lions football players
York University alumni
Winnipeg Blue Bombers players